Coffee County is the name of several counties in the United States:

 Coffee County, Alabama
 Coffee County, Georgia
 Coffee County, Tennessee

See also
 Coffey County, Kansas